The 2012 World's Strongest Man was the 35th edition of World's Strongest Man. The event was held on the grounds of the Commerce Casino in Los Angeles, California, US. The event was sponsored by MET-Rx. The qualifying heats were held from September 24–27, and the finals took place Sept. 30 & Oct. 1, 2012. The winner was Žydrūnas Savickas, it was his third WSM title. Vytautas Lalas of Lithuania was second, and Iceland's Hafþór Júlíus Björnsson was third.

In the qualifying heats, Derek Poundstone set a new world record in the Giant Dumbbell press event by pressing a  dumbbell overhead for 11 repetitions, and Vytautas Lalas set a new strongman squat world record by squatting  for 11 repetitions.

Line-up

Qualified athletes

Qualifying heats and final

Heat 1

events: loading, truck pull, giant dumbbell for reps, car deadlift for reps, keg toss, atlas stones

Heat 2

events: loading, truck pull, viking press for reps, super yoke, squat, atlas stones

Heat 3

events: loading, limo pull, giant dumbbell for reps, car deadlift for reps, keg toss, atlas stones

Heat 4

events: loading, limo pull, viking press for reps, squat, keg toss, atlas stones

Heat 5

events: loading, truck pull, viking press for reps, super yoke, car deadlift for reps, atlas stones

Finals

events: super yoke, log lift for max weight, truck pull, deadlift for reps, natural stone lift, power stairs

References

External links
 Official site

2012 in American sports
World's Strongest Man